Divorce Italian Style is a 1961 Italian dark comedy film directed by Pietro Germi. The screenplay is by Germi, Ennio De Concini, Alfredo Giannetti, and Agenore Incrocci, based on Giovanni Arpino's novel Un delitto d'onore (Honour Killing). It stars Marcello Mastroianni, Daniela Rocca, Stefania Sandrelli, Lando Buzzanca, and Leopoldo Trieste. The movie won the Academy Award for Best Writing, Story and Screenplay – Written Directly for the Screen; Mastroianni was nominated for Best Actor in a Leading Role and Germi for Best Director.

Plot
Ferdinando Cefalù (Marcello Mastroianni), a 37-year-old impoverished Sicilian nobleman, is married to Rosalia (Daniela Rocca), a devoted wife he no longer loves. He is in love with his cousin Angela (Stefania Sandrelli), a 16-year-old girl he sees only during the summer because her family sends her away to Catholic school in the city. Besides his wife, he shares his life with his elderly parents, his sister, and her fiancé, a funeral director; the family share their once stately palace with his uncles, who are slowly but surely eating away the remainders of their once rich estate.

Aware that divorce is illegal, Ferdinando fantasizes about doing away with his wife, such as by throwing her into a boiling cauldron, sending her into space in a rocket, or drowning her in quicksand. After a chance encounter with Angela during a family trip, he discovers that she shares his feelings. Inspired by a local story of a woman who killed her husband in a rage of jealousy, he resolves to lead his wife into having an affair so that he can catch her in flagrante delicto, murder her, and receive a light sentence for committing an honour killing. He first needs to find a suitable lover for his wife, whom he finds in the local priest's godson, Carmelo Patanè (Leopoldo Trieste), a painter who has had feelings for Rosalia for years and was for a time presumed killed during World War II. He also procures the State Prosecutor's friendship with a small favor. The final stage of his plan is to arrange for Carmelo's constant presence in his house, which he achieves by feigning interest in having his palace frescoes restored.

But Carmelo is timid with Rosalia, and she is initially committed to conjugal fidelity. Ferdinando tapes their private conversations and has to ward off the maid Sisina's infatuation with Carmelo. After Carmelo makes a pass at Sisina, she tells the priest, Carmelo's godfather, at confession, who informs her that Carmelo is married with three children, information she relays to Ferdinando. Rosalia and Carmelo finally give in to their passion but the tape of their conversation runs out just as they are arranging their next meeting. All Ferdinando knows is that it will take place the next evening.

Rosalia feigns a headache and remains home while the rest of the family goes to the cinema to see the local première of La Dolce Vita, a film so scandalous that no one wants to miss it. Ferdinando sneaks out of the theatre and returns home, arriving just in time to see Rosalia leaving for the train station. He retrieves his gun to kill her, but arrives at the station just after their train departs. He revisits his plan and the Criminal Code. It defines a crime of passion as executed in the heat of the moment or in defense of one's honor, so he embraces the role of a cuckold.

All along, Angela has been writing Ferdinando to assure him of her undying love for him. Her last letter is misdelivered to her father, who dies of a heart attack upon reading it. At the funeral, Ferdinando is approached by Mrs. Patanè, who demands to know what he will do about their situation. After he responds noncommittally, she spits in his face in front of the entire town, which gives him what he needs: an open insult to the family's honor due to his wife's elopement. The local Mafia boss offers to find the lovers within 24 hours, which he does. As Ferdinando goes to the lovers' hideout, he hears Mrs. Patanè kill Carmelo. He follows suit and kills Rosalia. At his trial he is defended by the State Prosecutor, who blames the whole thing on Ferdinando's father and his lack of love when raising him as a boy. He spends no more than three years in prison and returns home to find Angela waiting for him.

In the film's epilogue, Ferdinando and Angela are happily sailing at sea. As they kiss, the camera pans down, revealing Angela seductively rubbing her feet against those of the workman piloting the boat.

Cast

 Marcello Mastroianni as Ferdinando Cefalù
 Daniela Rocca as Rosalia Cefalù
 Stefania Sandrelli as Angela
 Leopoldo Trieste as Carmelo Patanè
 Odoardo Spadaro as Don Gaetano Cefalù
 Margherita Girelli as Sisina
 Angela Cardile as Agnese
 Lando Buzzanca as Rosario Mulè
 Pietro Tordi as Attorney De Marzi
 Ugo Torrente as Don Calogero
 Antonio Acqua as Priest
 Bianca Castagnetta as Donna Matilde Cefalù
 Giovanni Fassiolo
 Ignazio Roberto Daidone
 Francesco Nicastro

Release
Divorce Italian Style was released in Rome in December 1961.

Reception
When the film was released in the United States, it earned theatrical rentals of $803,666 in 1962 and a further $1,449,347 in 1963 for a total of $2,252,013 in the United States and Canada and was still in release in 1964.

Awards and nominations

Adaptations
In 2008 Giorgio Battistelli adapted Divorce Italian Style into an opera, Divorce à l'Italienne, which premiered by the Opéra national de Lorraine on September 30 of that year with tenor Wolfgang Ablinger Sperrhacke in Mastroianni's role. Battistelli chose to set every female role except Angela for low male voice;  sang the role of Rosalia.

References

External links

 
 
 
Divorce Italian Style: The Facts (and Fancies) of Murder an essay by Stuart Klawans at the Criterion Collection

1961 films
1961 comedy films
Italian comedy films
1960s Italian-language films
Italian satirical films
Italian black-and-white films
Commedia all'italiana
Films about divorce
Films about honor killing
Films set in Sicily
Films shot in Sicily
Films featuring a Best Musical or Comedy Actor Golden Globe winning performance
Films whose writer won the Best Original Screenplay Academy Award
Films directed by Pietro Germi
Films scored by Carlo Rustichelli
Films adapted into operas
1960s Italian films